

Paleontologists
 Birth of pioneering French paleontologist Jacques Amand Eudes-Deslongchamps.

Animals
 Ursus spelaeus, the Cave Bear, is described.

References

18th century in paleontology
Paleontology